Mammoth Creek may refer to:

 Mammoth Creek, the upper part of Hot Creek in Mono County, California, United States
 Mammoth Creek (Utah), tributary of the Sevier River in Iron and Garfield counties in Utah, United States